River Plaza is an unincorporated community located within Middletown Township in Monmouth County, New Jersey, United States. It is adjacent to the Navesink River and Shadow Lake. 

The settlement is mainly made up of small single-family homes on a peninsula between the river and lake, though parts of the community stretch north of the lake. The community's one elementary school, River Plaza Elementary, is located north of the lake on Hubbard Avenue (County Route 12). The other major road in River Plaza, Front Street, carries CR 10 east of Hubbard Avenue and travels to Red Bank via the Hubbards Bridge over the Navesink River.

Notable people

People who were born in, are residents of, or otherwise closely associated with River Plaza include:
 Peter Dobson (born 1964), actor who had a cameo role in Forrest Gump as Elvis Presley.
 Debbie Harry (born 1945), singer-songwriter and actress, lead singer of the band Blondie.
 Olivia Nuzzi (born 1993), political journalist.

References

Middletown Township, New Jersey
Unincorporated communities in Monmouth County, New Jersey
Unincorporated communities in New Jersey